Hemimorphite is the chemical compound Zn4(Si2O7)(OH)2·H2O, a component of mineral calamine. It is a silicate mineral which, together with smithsonite (ZnCO3), has been historically mined from the upper parts of zinc and lead ores. Both compounds were originally believed to be the same mineral and classified as calamine. In the second half of the 18th century, it was discovered that these two different compounds were both present in calamine. They closely resemble one another.

The silicate was the rarer of the two and was named hemimorphite because of the hemimorph development of its crystals. This unusual form, which is typical of only a few minerals, means that the crystals are terminated by dissimilar faces. Hemimorphite most commonly forms crystalline crusts and layers, also massive, granular, rounded and reniform aggregates, concentrically striated, or finely needle-shaped, fibrous or stalactitic, and rarely fan-shaped clusters of crystals.

Some specimens show strong green fluorescence in shortwave ultraviolet light (253.7 nm) and weak light pink fluorescence in longwave UV.

Occurrence

Hemimorphite most frequently occurs as the product of the oxidation of the upper parts of sphalerite bearing ore bodies, accompanied by other secondary minerals which form the so-called iron cap or gossan. Hemimorphite is an important ore of zinc and contains up to 54.2% of the metal, together with silicon, oxygen and hydrogen. The crystals are blunt at one end and sharp at the other.

The regions on the Belgian-German border are well known for their deposits of hemimorphite of metasomatic origin, especially Vieille Montagne in Belgium and Aachen in Germany. Other deposits are in Tarnowskie Góry area in Upper Silesia, Poland; near Phoenixville, Pennsylvania; the Missouri lead-zinc district; Elkhorn, Montana; Leadville, Colorado; and Organ Mountains, New Mexico in the United States; and in several localities in North Africa. Further hemimorphite occurrences are the Padaeng deposit near Mae Sod in western Thailand; Sardinia; Nerchinsk, Siberia; Cave del Predil, Italy; Bleiberg, Carinthia, Austria; Matlock, Derbyshire, England.

References

Further reading 

Hurlbut, Cornelius S.; Klein, Cornelis, 1985, Manual of Mineralogy, 20th ed., 
Boni, M., Gilg, H.A., Aversa, G., and Balassone, G., 2003, The "Calamine" of southwest Sardinia: Geology, mineralogy, and stable isotope geochemistry of supergene Zn mineralization: Economic Geology, v. 98, p. 731-748.
Reynolds, N.A., Chisnall, T.W., Kaewsang, K., Keesaneyabutr, C., and Taksavasu, T., 2003, The Padaeng supergene nonsulfide zinc deposit, Mae Sod, Thailand: Economic Geology, v. 98, p. 773-785.
Mineral galleries

Sorosilicates
Zinc minerals
Orthorhombic minerals
Minerals in space group 44
Minerals described in 1853